Dirk Weetendorf (born 1 October 1972) is a German former professional footballer, who played as a striker, and manager.

Career
Weetendorf was born in Burg auf Fehmarn. Between 1996 and 1999 he played three seasons in the Bundesliga for Hamburger SV and Werder Bremen, but did not become a regular starter at either club. In 1999, he moved to Regionalliga Nord side Eintracht Braunschweig, where he became a prolific scorer and contributed significantly to the club's promotion to the 2. Bundesliga in 2002. However, constant injury problems forced Weetendorf to retire early from football just one year later.

Honours
 DFB-Pokal: 1998–99

References

External links

1972 births
Living people
People from Fehmarn
Footballers from Schleswig-Holstein
Association football forwards
German footballers
German football managers
Eintracht Braunschweig players
Hamburger SV players
SV Werder Bremen players
Bundesliga players
Eintracht Braunschweig non-playing staff